Christopher "Oly" Hicks (born July 31, 1968) is a Canadian-Italian ice hockey coach. He is currently the Director of Hockey Operations with the Val Pusteria Wolves of the Italian Elite.A.

Hicks played junior hockey in the British Columbia Hockey League, followed by a professional career that saw him play briefly in the ECHL, and also in Austria, before he turned his attention to coaching.

From 2001 to 2008, Hicks served as a coach within the Manhattanville College ice hockey program. Starting with the 2008–09 season, Hicks moved to Italy to become the head coach of the Vipiteno Broncos, then playing in Italy's second level - the Serie A2. Under Hicks' coaching, the team was twice the Serie A2 champion (2009 and 2011), and received a promotion to play the 2011–12 season in the Serie A, before being relegated back to the Serie A2 for the 2012–13 season.

Championships
2008-09: Serie A2 Champion with the Vipiteno Broncos
2010-11: Serie A2 Champion with the Vipiteno Broncos- Promotion to Serie A

References

External links
 

1968 births
Living people
Canadian ice hockey defencemen
Kelowna Spartans players
Richmond Renegades players
Ice hockey people from Calgary
Summerland Buckaroos players